3000 or variation, may refer to:

 3000 (number), the number three thousand
 A.D. 3000, the last year of the 30th century and 3rd millennium CE
 3000 BCE, a year in the 3rd millennium BC
 3000s AD, a decade, century, millennium in the 4th millennium CE
 3000s BCE, a decade, century, millennium in the 4th millennium BC
 3000 (dinghy), a racing sailing dinghy
 André 3000, American singer and actor
 3000, also styled Three Thousand, the title of the screenplay by J.F. Lawton that was adapted as Pretty Woman (1990)
 3,000 hit club, Major League Baseball batters with 3,000 hits
 3000 metres, a track running event
 "Year 3000", a song performed by British pop punk band Busted
 Fiat 3000, an Italian tank
 HP 3000, a minicomputer
 Lenovo 3000, a computer
 3000 Leonardo, an asteroid in the Asteroid Belt, the 3000th asteroid registered
 3000 (District of Elbasan), one of the postal codes in Albania

See also

 3000 series (disambiguation)